The W25 are the Women's National Basketball Association's Top 25 Players of All Time, chosen in 2021 on the occasion of the 25th season of the WNBA from amongst 72 nominees compiled by the league. The group, selected by a panel consisting of media members and pioneering women's basketball figures, was to comprise the 25 best and most influential players of the first 25 years of the WNBA, with consideration also accorded to sportsmanship, community service, leadership, and contribution to the growth of women's basketball. To be considered, players had to have competed in the WNBA for at least two seasons, and fit at least four of seven criteria:
 Winning a major individual playing award.
 Selection to at least one All-WNBA Team at any level.
 Selection to at least one WNBA All-Defensive Team at any level.
 Selection for at least one WNBA All-Star Game.
 Member of at least one WNBA championship team.
 A ranking among the top 40 career leaders in any major statistical category, as of the start of the 2021 season.
 Winner of the WNBA's season-long Community Assist Award. 

The W25 were announced on September 5, 2021 at halftime of the Las Vegas Aces–Chicago Sky game, televised in the U.S. by ABC.

The announcement of The W25 was immediately followed by "Vote for the GOAT". From September 5–19, fans voted on the WNBA's official website, the WNBA's mobile app, and Twitter to determine which member of The W25 they considered to be the league's greatest of all time. Before Game 1 of the 2021 WNBA Finals on October 10 at Footprint Center in Phoenix, Arizona, Diana Taurasi was announced as the fans' "GOAT".

Players selected
Notes
 All information only pertains to the first 25 years of the league's existence.
 No awards or honors that were presented after the 2021 regular season are included. The 2021 All-Star Game is included because it took place before the final announcement of The W25.

 The inaugural WNBA All-Star Game took place during the 1999 season, and the game has been contested yearly since, with the following exceptions:
 From 2004 through 2016, no All-Star Game was held in any Olympic year. The 2004 edition was supplanted by a game between WNBA players from both conferences and the 2004 United States Olympic team, and the 2010 edition was replaced by a game between WNBA players from both conferences and Team USA, but the WNBA does not consider either to have been an All-Star Game.
 No All-Star Game was scheduled in 2020, accommodating the original scheduling of that year's Summer Olympics. The Olympics were delayed to 2021 due to COVID-19 issues.
 With the Tokyo Olympics rescheduled for 2021, the WNBA held a pre-Olympic game between WNBA players from both conferences and the 2021 US Olympic team. Unlike the 2004 and 2010 editions, the 2021 edition was officially classified as an All-Star Game.
 Players who were voted to start in All-Star Games but were unable to play due to injury are nevertheless considered to have been starters; players voted as reserves who started in place of other injured players are nevertheless considered to have been reserves.
Three players included in previous lists, Dawn Staley (All-Decade and 15 Years Team), Teresa Weatherspoon (15 Years and 20@20) and Deanna Nolan (20@20) missed the W25.

Footnotes

References

W25
2021 WNBA season